Das Kloster ("The Cloister"; full title Das Kloster. Weltlich und geistlich. Meist aus der ältern deutschen Volks-, Wunder-, Curiositäten-, und vorzugsweise komischen Literatur "The Cloister. Profane and sacred. Mostly from older German Popular, Miraculous, Curious and especially Comical Literature") is a collection of magical and occult texts, chapbooks, folklore, popular superstition and fairy tales of the German Renaissance compiled by Stuttgart antiquarian Johann Scheible in 12 volumes,  1845-1849. 
Vols. 3, 5 and 11 are dedicated to the Faust legend. Vols. 7, 9 and 12 dealing with topics of folklore and ethnography were written by F. Nork (pseudonym of Friedrich Korn, 1803–1850).

vol. 1 (1845), 840 pp, ch. 1-4 Volksprediger, Moralisten und frommer Unsinn
vol. 2 (1846), 1074 pp, ch. 5-8, Doctor Johann Faust 
vol. 3 (1846), 1065 pp,  ch. 9-12, Christoph Wagner, Don Juan Tenorio und verschiedene Schwarzkünstler und Beschwörer
9. Christoph Wagner 
10. incantation and oracle
11. Don Juan Tenorio of Sevilla
12. pacts with the devil, various nigromancers
vol. 4 (1846), 840 pp,  Der Theuerdank by Thomas Murner
vol. 5 (1847), 1160 pp,  Die Sage vom Faust bis zum Erscheinen des ersten Volksbuches, mit Literatur und Vergleichung aller folgenden 
vol. 6 (1847), 1106 pp, ch. 21-24 Die gute alte Zeit, after the manuscript collection of Wilhelm von Reinöhl
vol. 7 (1847), 1120 pp, F. Nork, Der Festkalender, enthaltend die Sinndeute der Monatszeichen, die Entstehungs- und Umbildungsgeschichte von Naturfesten in Kirchenfeste (on the liturgical year and its evolution out of pagan festivals)
vol. 8 (1847) 1122pp, Johann Fischart's Geschichtsklitterung und aller Praktik Grossmutter
vol. 9 (1848), 1078 pp, ch. 33-36, F. Nork, Mythologie der Volksfragen und Volksmärchen
vol. 10 (1848) 1184 pp, ch. 37-40, Johann Fischart's Flöhhatz, Weibertratz, Ehezuchtbüchlein, podagrammisch Trostbüchlein etc.
37.-38. Thomas Murner
39.-40. Johann Fischart
vol. 11 (1849), 1222 pp, Die Geschichte vom Faust in Reimen etc.
vol. 12 (1849), 1188 pp, F. Nork, Die Sitten und Gebräuche der Deutschen und ihrer Nachbarvölker etc.

Scheible also edited the ''Bibliotheca magica (1873–1874).

See also
Renaissance magic
German folklore

References

Occult books
Grimoires
1840s books
German books
German folklore